Mahdi Rasikh; (born 1985) is a politician and former parliamentary lawyer from Afghanistan. He represented the people of Maidan Wardak in the Afghanistan parliament.

Early life and education
Mahdi Rasikh was born in 1985 in Day Mirdad, Maidan Wardak, in a Hazara family. He holds a Master's degree in sociology.

See also
 List of Hazara people

References

1985 births
Living people
Afghan politicians
Hazara politicians
Members of the House of the People (Afghanistan)